This is a list of what are intended to be the notable top hotels by country, five or four star hotels, notable skyscraper landmarks or historic hotels which are covered in multiple reliable publications. It should not be a directory of every hotel in every country:

Pakistan

Palau
Palau Royal Resort, Koror

Palestine

 Al Deira Hotel, Gaza
 Gaza Museum of Archaeology, Gaza
 Mövenpick Hotel Ramallah, Ramallah

Panama
Trump Ocean Club International Hotel and Tower, Panama City

Papua New Guinea
Islander Hotel, Port Moresby

Peru

 Hotel Bolivar, Lima
 Hotel Monasterio, Cusco
 Hotel Paracas, Pisco
 Miraflores Park Hotel, Lima

Philippines

Poland

Portugal
Afonso II Pousada
Belmond Reid's Palace
Buçaco Palace
Cascais Pousada a.k.a. Cascais Citadel Pousada
Porto Pousada a.k.a. Freixo Palace Pousada
Grande Hotel da Póvoa
Lawrence's Hotel
Óbidos Castle Pousada
Pestana Palace
Maria I Pousada
Ria Pousada
Santa Cruz Pousada a.k.a. Horta Pousada
Seteais Palace
Verride Santa Catarina Palace
Vidago Palace Hotel

Puerto Rico

Qatar
Sheraton Doha Resort & Convention Hotel, Doha

References

P